William Sexton (January 3, 1819 – May 20, 1895) was an Ontario farmer, auctioneer and political figure. He represented Wentworth South in the Legislative Assembly of Ontario as a Liberal member from 1867 to 1879.

He was born in Schenectady, New York in 1819 and came to Ancaster Township in Upper Canada in 1832 with his parents. In 1840, Sexton married Eleanor Wilkins. He served on the township council and was reeve in 1859. In 1890, he moved to Hamilton, Ontario. He served as a commissioner in the Court of Queen's Bench for Wentworth County.

References

External links 

Ancaster's Heritage, Ancster Historical Society (1973)
The Canadian parliamentary companion, HJ Morgan (1873)

1819 births
1895 deaths
Politicians from Schenectady, New York
American emigrants to pre-Confederation Ontario
Immigrants to Upper Canada
Ontario Liberal Party MPPs
Politicians from Hamilton, Ontario